Olivier Burri (born 4 September 1963 in Hazebrouck, Switzerland) is a rally driver who has competed in the World Rally Championship on various occasions since 1991, almost exclusively at the Monte Carlo Rally.

Biography

Career in Rally
Burri's professional rallying début was at the 1991 Monte Carlo Rally driving a Ford Sierra RS Cosworth. 1991 also saw his début in the European Rally Championship which he has had modest success in. He has entered in eighteen ERC rounds, winning six of them. He has also competed in the Rallye International du Valais, a Swiss-based rally that is also a part of the ERC, which he has won numerous times. During the Monte Carlo Rally's time as part of the Intercontinental Rally Challenge, it has not stopped Burri from competing regularly at the infamous rally, finishing seventh overall in 2009.

Results

Complete WRC results

* Season still in progress.

IRC results

References

External links
 Results at ewrc-results.com

World Rally Championship drivers
1963 births
Living people
Swiss racing drivers
Intercontinental Rally Challenge drivers
European Rally Championship drivers
Nürburgring 24 Hours drivers